Etamestrol (INN) (developmental code name ZK-77992), or eptamestrol, also known as 7α-methyl-19-nor-17α-pregna-1,3,5(10)-trien-20-yne-1,3,17-triol 1,3-dibenzoate, is a synthetic, steroidal estrogen described as an ovulation inhibitor (or hormonal contraceptive) that was synthesized in 1979 but was never marketed.

References

Esters
Estranes
Synthetic estrogens